The family name Landrieu is a prominent name in the politics of the state of Louisiana, and may refer to:

Moon Landrieu (1930-2022), former mayor of New Orleans, United States Secretary of Housing and Urban Development, and Louisiana judge
Mary Landrieu (born 1955), daughter of Moon Landrieu and former United States Senator from Louisiana, state treasurer, and state legislator
Mitch Landrieu (born 1960), son of Moon Landrieu and Senior Advisor to the President for Infrastructure Coordination, former mayor of New Orleans, lieutenant governor, and state legislator
 Madeleine Landrieu, daughter of Moon Landrieu and former Louisiana judge.

History
The family is reported to be of French and German descent and coming from Aslace and Prussia. Before moving to Louisiana the Landrieu family lived in Mississippi in the 1800s. 

Moon's wife is Sicilian American. For this reason, their daughter Mary Landrieu has been repeatedly highlighted by the Order of the Sons of Italy in America

The Landrieu family, has sometimes faced rumors that the family has partial Black heritage. Mitch Landrieu eventually addressed these claims.

Government Offices held
 Moon Landrieu: Louisiana State Representative 1960-1966, Mayor of New Orleans 1970-1978, United States Secretary of Housing and Urban Development. 
Mary Landrieu: Louisiana House of Representatives 1980-1988, Treasurer of Louisiana 1988-1996, United States Senator from Louisiana 1997-2015.
Mitch Landrieu: Louisiana House of Representatives 1988-2004, Lieutenant Governor of Louisiana 2004-2010, Mayor of New Orleans 2010-2028, Senior Advisor to the President for Infrastructure Coordination 2021-present.

References

 
Landrieu family